Nina Rootes is a translator of French and Italian literature. An award-winning translator, she has also published a novel, several short stories and an autobiographical book.

Life
Rootes travelled to Italy in 1958, and found herself working in the movie business there. She later married a film editor, and lived and worked in Toronto, Madrid and Rome. Her translation of Sky Memoirs by Blaise Cendrars won the Florence Gould Translation Prize in 1993.

Works

Translations
 The astonished man: a novel by Blaise Cendrars, 1970. Translated from the French L'homme foudroyé.
 Planus by Blaise Cendrars, 1972. Translated from the French Bourlinguer
 Memoirs of a female thief by Dacia Maraini, 1973. Translated from the Italian Memorie di una ladra.
 Lice by Blaise Cendrars, 1973. Translated with revisions from the French La main coupeé.
 I was a Kamikaze. The Knights of the Divine Wind by Ryuji Nagatsuka, 1973. Translated from the French J'etais un Kamikazé les chevaliers du vent divin. With an introduction by Pierre Clostermann
 Amacord. Portrait of a town by Federico Fellini, with Tonino Guera. Translated from the Italian.
 The art of eating in France: manners and menus in the nineteenth century by Jean-Paul Aron. Translated from the French.
 Les onze mill verges: or, The amorous adventures of Prince Mony Vibescu by Guillaume Apollinaire, 1976. With an introduction by Richard N. Coe. Translated from the French.
 The Gnostics by Jacques Lacarrière, 1976. Translated from the French Les gnostiques. With a foreword by Lawrence Durrell.
 Gold: the marvellous history of General John Augustus Sutter by Blaise Cendrars, 1982. Translated from the French L'or, ou, La merveilleuse histoire du General Johann August Sutter.
 The knockabout by Blaise Cendrars, 1982
 Dan Yack by Blaise Cendrars, 1987. Translated from the French.
 Behind the image: the art of reading paintings by Federico Zeri, 1990. Translated from the Italian Dietro l'immagine'. 
 The empire of sleep by Henri-Frédéric Blanc. Translated from the French Empire du sommeil.
 Sky: memoirs by Blaise Cendrars, 1996.
 (tr. with Andrée Masoin de Virton) The wheel of fortune: the autobiography of Edith Piaf by Edith Piaf, 2004

Other
 Mary Dexter, Mary Sinister, 1983
 The frog prince, 1985
 Adventures in the movie biz'', 2013

References

Year of birth missing (living people)
Living people
Italian–English translators